Qiu Jun (Chinese: 邱峻; Pinyin: Qiū Jùn; born August 24, 1982) is a Chinese professional Go player.

Biography 
Jun started learning Go at the age of 6. He became a professional in 1994. Over the next 3 years, he gained 3 consecutive promotions. He was promoted to 7 dan in 2005 and then reached 8 dan in 2006. In 2009, Jun reached the Samsung Cup Final with a chance to win his first world championship. He lost the Final 0–2 to Kong Jie, and during August 2011 Jun again reached a world championship Final, this time the 23rd Fujitsu Cup Final. By Chinese Special Promotion rules, Jun was raised to the rank of 9-dan, being China's 31st 9-dan player. He subsequently lost the final to Korean rising star Park Junghwan. Jun joins a selection of players who have reached multiple World Championship Finals without victories in any.

Titles & Runners-Up

References 

1982 births
Living people
Go players from Shanghai